1975 Women's Nordic Football Championship was the second edition of the Women's Nordic Football Championship tournament. It was held from 25 July to 27 July in Brande, Vejen and Vejle in Denmark.

Standings

Results

Goalscorers 
3 goals
  Annette Frederiksen
  Susanne Niemann

2 goals
  Ann Jansson
  Lone Nielsen
  Charlotte Nielsen-Mann

1 goal
  Bente Jensen Kramager
  Görel Sintorn
  Pia Sundhage
  Jeanette Toftdahl

Sources 
Nordic Championships (Women) 1975 Rec.Sport.Soccer Statistics Foundation
Landsholdsdatabasen Danish Football Association
Lautela, Yrjö & Wallén, Göran: Rakas jalkapallo — Sata vuotta suomalaista jalkapalloa, p. 418. Football Association of Finland / Teos Publishing 2007. .

Women's Nordic Football Championship
1975–76 in European football
1975 in women's association football
1975
1975 in Finnish football
1975 in Swedish football
1975 in Danish football
Women's football in Denmark
1975 in Danish women's sport
July 1975 sports events in Europe